Robert Sutton (died 1414), of Lincoln, Lincolnshire, was an English merchant, Member of Parliament and mayor.

Family
His brother, John Sutton, was also an MP for Lincoln, as was his son, Hamon Sutton.

Career
Sutton was one of the wealthiest and most influential merchants in Lincoln and was elected Mayor of Lincoln and Mayor of the Boston Staple for 1379–80.

He was a Member (MP) of the Parliament of England for Lincoln in 1381, May 1382, October 1383, November 1384, 1385, 1386, February 1388, 1391, 1394, January 1397 and 1399.

References

14th-century births
1414 deaths
English MPs 1381
Members of the Parliament of England (pre-1707) for Lincoln
Mayors of Lincoln, England
14th-century English businesspeople
English MPs May 1382
English MPs October 1383
English MPs November 1384
English MPs 1385
English MPs 1386
English MPs February 1388
English MPs 1391
English MPs 1394
English MPs January 1397
English MPs 1399